A list of books and essays about Michael Haneke:

Haneke